In Psychology, the numerical Stroop effect (related to the standard Stroop effect) demonstrates the relationship between numerical values and physical sizes. 
When digits are presented visually, they can be physically large or small, irrespective of their actual values. Congruent pairs occur when size and value correspond (e.g., large 5  small 3) while incongruent pairs occur when size and value are incompatible (e.g., large 3 small 5). It was found that when people are asked to compare digits, their reaction time tends to be slower in the case of incongruent pairs. This reaction time difference between congruent and incongruent pairs is termed the numerical Stroop effect (or the size incongruity effect; SICE)
 
In a numerical Stroop experiment, participants carry out a physical or a numerical size judgement task in separate blocks. In the numerical task, participants respond to the values and ignore the physical sizes and in the physical task, participants respond to the sizes and ignore the values. It is also possible to add neutral pairs to the basic task. In neutral pairs the two digits vary in one dimension only (e.g., the pair 5 3 for the numerical task and large 3 small 3 for the physical task). Neutral pairs enable measuring facilitation (i.e., the difference in reaction time between neutral and congruent pairs) and interference (i.e., the difference in reaction time between incongruent and neutral pairs).

Original experiments
Besner and Coltheart (1979) asked participants to compare values and ignore the  sizes of the digits (i.e., the numerical task). They reported that the irrelevant sizes slowed down responding when sizes were incongruent with the values of the digits. Henik and Tzelgov (1982) examined not only the numerical task but also the physical task. The numerical Stroop effect was found in both tasks. Moreover, when the two dimensions were congruent, responding was facilitated (relative to neutral trials) and when the two dimensions were incongruent, responding was slower (relative to neutral trials).

Experimental findings
The original Stroop effect is asymmetrical - color responses are slowed down by irrelevant words but word reading is commonly not affected by irrelevant colors. Unlike the Stroop effect, the numerical Stroop effect is symmetrical – irrelevant sizes affect the comparisons of values and irrelevant values affect comparisons of sizes. The latter gave rise to the suggestion that values are processed automatically because this occurs even when responding to values is much slower than responding to sizes.
Moreover, processing values depends on familiarity with the numerical symbolic system. Accordingly, young children may show the size effect in numerical comparisons but not the effect of values in physical size comparisons.

Neuroanatomy
Functional magnetic resonance imaging (fMRI) studies have pinpointed the brain regions that are involved in the numerical Stroop effect. In these studies the most consistent finding was the involvement of the parietal cortex, with increased activation for incongruent in comparison to congruent trials. When a neutral condition was included, it was observed that the bilateral parietal lobes were the only regions that were involved in both facilitation and interference. 
Electroencephalography (EEG) studies have indicated that the amplitude or the latency of the P300 wave is modulated as a function of the congruity effect. This means that when looking at amplitude, the difference between the amplitude of the congruent and incongruent condition is observed 300 ms after the presentation of the digits. In addition, behavioral, physiological, and computational studies support the view, although not unanimously, that the conflict between congruent and incongruent conditions is observed up to the response level, and is dependent on the developmental stage of the participant.

The above-mentioned studies allow inferring the neural correlate of the numerical Stroop effect. However, they do not allow concluding whether parietal lobe function is critical for this effect. Brain stimulation studies that use techniques such as transcranial magnetic stimulation or transcranial direct current stimulation allow modulating parietal lobe function and inferring its role. These studies have suggested that the right parietal lobe in particular is necessary for the numerical Stroop effect, albeit stimulation of the right parietal lobe might affect other connected brain regions. Moreover, work with acquired acalculia suggested involvement of the left parietal lobe in the numerical Stroop effect. This effect is commonly reduced in cases of brain damage to the left intraparietal sulcus.

References

Psychological effects
Neuropsychology